Markel Humphrey (born November 21, 1987) is an American basketball player who plays for BBC Monthey of the Swiss Basketball League. He usually plays as small forward or shooting guard.

Professional career
In 2009 Humphrey signed with Matrixx Magixx, a team based in Nijmegen, Netherlands. He extended his contract after his first season. Humphrey also returned for a third season with Magixx.

He signed with JSA Bordeaux Basket, a team from the LNB Pro B for the 2012–13 season.

In May 2013 he signed with Saint-Quentin, another team from the Pro B.

Since 2015, Humphrey plays in Switzerland where he has played for Lions de Genève, BBC Monthey and Union Neuchâtel. He spent the 2019–20 season with Lions de Genève and averaged 14.1 points, 6.8 rebounds, 2.4 assists and 1.1 steals per game, earning Eurobasket.com All-Swiss SBL Co-Defensive Player of the Year honors. On October 1, 2020, Humphrey signed with Union Neuchâtel.

Honors
Matrixx Magixx
All-DBL Team: 2011–12
DBL All-Star (2): 2010, 2011
DBL All-Star Game MVP: 2011

References

External links
Profile at draftexpress.com
Eurobasket profile
ESPN Profile

1987 births
Living people
American expatriate basketball people in France
American expatriate basketball people in the Netherlands
American expatriate basketball people in Switzerland
Basketball players from Atlanta
BBC Monthey players
Dutch Basketball League players
Marshall Thundering Herd men's basketball players
Matrixx Magixx players
Shooting guards
Union Neuchâtel Basket players
Small forwards
American men's basketball players